The Chalice à soleil is a gilded silver cup dating to 16th century France. The chalice is currently in the collection of the Metropolitan Museum of Art.

Description 
Made in the first decades of the French Renaissance, the chalice is made from silver sheathed in gold. The cup is decorated with carving made in accordance with the School of Fontainebleau. Various motifs and symbols are depicted on the chalice; fleurs-de-lis are seen, as is an episcopal hat, shields, and various other French liturgical objects. As befitting a piece from the Early Renaissance, the cup's stem is similar to designs from the Roman Empire, the emulation of whose art and culture was a major driving force behind the Renaissance.

References 

Metalwork of the Metropolitan Museum of Art
Chalices